Route 465 is an  long north-east secondary highway in the northwest portion of New Brunswick, Canada.

The route's southern terminus starts at the intersection of Route 126 in Coal Branch heading north-east into the community of Clairville. The road follows the Richibucto River north entering the community of Beersville then intersects with Route 470 near Fords Mills. The road then heads north-west crossing the Richibucto River passing the community of Cails Mills then heads west. Following the Richibucto River on the South bank, the road ends at the community of Smiths Corner at the intersection of Route 116.

See also

References

465
465